Michael Davis (born April 29, 1958) is an American comics artist, writer, and one of the co-founders of Milestone Media.

Career 
Davis wrote an advice column for the Comic Buyer's Guide in the late 1980s. He founded Bad Boy Studios to mentor younger creators. In 1989, he collaborated as an artist with Tim Conrad on the series Etc. for DC Comics' Piranha Press.

In 1992, he co-founded Milestone Media with Dwayne McDuffie, Denys Cowan, and Derek T. Dingle, contributing to the creation of characters including Hardware, Static Shock, Icon, and the Blood Syndicate, but focusing more on the business side of the venture, with Dingle.

After leaving Milestone, he launched Motown Machine Works, where he was joined by Cowan. He served as president/CEO of Motown Animation & Filmworks but left in 1996. He was also President of Animation for Magic Johnson Entertainment. In 2006 he created The Guardian Line comic for Urban Ministries. He has written regular columns for the website ComicMix and "From the Edge" for Bleeding Cool. Davis was inducted into The Harvey Awards Hall Of Fame

The Black Panel 
Michael Davis started the Black Panel, at San Diego Comic-Con in 1997. The Black Panel is a mix of Black and often non-Black entertainment industry movers, shakers, and newcomers. Comics are an essential part but far from being the only component of the panel. Black content from all areas of the entertainment arena is fair game in the dialogue. Black culture is youth culture in America, and the Black Panel attempts to bring insight, information, and access to its vast, diverse audience.

References 

African-American comics creators
American comics artists
American comics creators
Inkpot Award winners
Living people
1958 births
21st-century African-American people
20th-century African-American people